The discography of Mallu Magalhães, a Brazilian Folk singer, consists of two studio albums, one live albums, five singles as a lead artist, one collaborations with Marcelo Camelo and one video albums.

In 2008 she released her first eponymous album and in 2009 she released her second album, also self-titled.

She already has five singles released, and the most famous is Tchubaruba.

Albums

Studio albums

Compilations

Video albums

Notes
 These albums did not reach any of the charts in Brazil.

Singles

As lead artist

Other appearances

Notes
 These albums did not reach any of the charts in Brazil.

Music videos 
 J1 (2008)
 Tchubaruba (2008)
 O Preço da Flor (2009)
 Vanguart (2009)
 Shine Yellow (2009)

References

External links
Mallu Magalhães's official website
Mallu Magalhães's official MySpace

Folk music discographies
Discography
Discographies of Brazilian artists
Latin music discographies